Piperidine alkaloids are naturally occurring chemical compounds from the group of alkaloids, which are chemically derived from piperidine.

Alkaloids with a piperidine building block are widespread and are usually further subdivided according to their occurrence and biogenetic origin. The most important representative of piperidine alkaloids is piperine, which is responsible for the pungent taste of pepper.

The piperidine alkaloids also include the sedum alkaloids (e.g. sedamine), pelletierine, the lobelia alkaloids (e.g. lobeline), the conium alkaloids (such as coniine) and the pinus alkaloids.

Literature